Wekerle is a surname. Notable people with the name include:

Hartmut Wekerle (born 1944), German medical scientist and neurobiologist
Michael Wekerle, Canadian merchant banker and television personality
Sándor Wekerle (1848–1921),  Hungarian politician and Prime Minister of Hungary
Sándor Wekerle Jr. (1878–1963), Hungarian politician and Minister of Finance

See also
Wekerle Business School (Hungarian: Wekerle Sándor Üzleti Főiskola), college in Budapest, Hungary
Wekerle estate (Hungarian: Wekerletelep), part of Budapest's XIX. district (known as Kispest), Hungary